The 2005 World Marathon Cup was the 11th edition of the World Marathon Cup of athletics and were held in Helsinki, Finland, inside of the 2005 World Championships.

Results

See also
2005 World Championships in Athletics – Men's Marathon
2005 World Championships in Athletics – Women's Marathon

References

External links
 IAAF web site

World Marathon Cup
World
2005 in Finnish sport
Marathons in Finland
International athletics competitions hosted by Finland